Everett Ellis Briggs (born April 6, 1934, in Havana, Cuba) is a United States diplomat.

Briggs was born in Havana, Cuba in 1934, to Ellis Ormsbee Briggs and Lucy Barnard Briggs, where his father was stationed as a U.S. diplomat.

He is an alumnus of Dartmouth College.

He served as United States Ambassador to Panama from 1982 to 1986, United States Ambassador to Honduras from 1986 to 1989, and United States Ambassador to Portugal from 1990 to 1993. He also served abroad in Bolivia, Occupied Berlin, Angola, Paraguay and Colombia. 

He worked to indict Manuel Noriega, during his term in Panama.
He was Special Assistant to the President for National Security Affairs, on the National Security Council.

He was president of the Americas Society and Council of the Americas.

He is the author of two memoirs, Ambassador's Apprentice and Honor to State (2018).

References

Sources
Everett Ellis Briggs at The Political Graveyard

1934 births
Living people
Ambassadors of the United States to Honduras
Ambassadors of the United States to Panama
Ambassadors of the United States to Portugal
Dartmouth College alumni
Hispanic and Latino American diplomats